The Delta is a novel by Colin Wilson published in 1987.

Plot summary
The Delta is a novel in which a vital spiritual force causes insects to grow large, so Niall heads for the Delta where it originates.

Reception
Dave Langford reviewed The Delta for White Dwarf #100, and stated that "The Delta is better than promised by The Tower, but the crudeness of its SF tropes detracts from the more interesting Wilson philosophy."

Reviews
Review by Jim England (1988) in Vector 142

References

1987 novels
Novels by Colin Wilson